Glipidiomorpha rufiterga is a species of beetle in the genus Glipidiomorpha of the family Mordellidae. It was described in 2000 by Lu & Fan.

References

Beetles described in 2000
Mordellidae